Masisi is a town in the North Kivu Province in the east of the Democratic Republic of the Congo (DRC). It is the administrative center of the Masisi Territory.

Location

Overview

Masisi is the location of a number of cheese factories. Most of the cheese produced in the DRC comes from Masisi Territory.

During the last decade, Masisi and the surrounding countryside have witnessed strife and conflict as the many militias in this part of the country fought each other and against FARDC and MONUC, for territory and wealth. Many have either been killed or permanently disabled, with more carrying residual psychological trauma.

Population
, the population of Masisi is 6,502 people.

See also
 United Nations Force Intervention Brigade
 March 23 Movement
 National Congress for the Defence of the People
 Rally for Congolese Democracy
 Rally for Congolese Democracy–Goma
 Democratic Forces for the Liberation of Rwanda
 Mai Mai
 Western Rift Valley

References

Populated places in North Kivu